The Roman Catholic Territorial Prelature of Bocas del Toro is a Latin ecclesiastical circumscription suffragan to the Metropolitan Archdiocese of Panamá.

Its cathedral episcopal see is Catedral Nuestra Señora del Carmen (dedicated to Our Lady of Mount Carmel), in Bocas del Toro, on Isla Colón, in Panama's western, Atlantic Bocas del Toro province.

History 
It was established on 17 October 1962 as Territorial Prelature on territory split off from the Roman Catholic Diocese of David.

Prelate Ordinaries 
(all Roman Rite, so far members of a Latin congregation)

Bishop-prelates of Boca del Toro 
 Martin Legarra Tellechea, Order of Augustinian Recollects (O.A.R.) (1963.11.06 – 1969.04.03), Titular Bishop of Luperciana (1965.03.18 – 1969.04.03); later Bishop of Santiago de Veraguas (Panama) (1969.04.03 – 1975.02.15)
 José Agustín Ganuza García, O.A.R. (1970.03.12 – 2008.05.01), Titular Bishop of Pauzera (1972.02.04 – 1977.11.18)
 Aníbal Saldaña Santamaría, O.A.R. (2008.05.01 – ...)

See also 
 List of Roman Catholic dioceses in Panama

References

External links 
 GigaCatholic with incumbent biography links

Bocas del Toro
Bocas
Bocas del Toro
Bocas del Toro
1962 establishments in Panama
Roman Catholic Ecclesiastical Province of Panamá